= Derby Market Hall =

Market building in Derby, England

Coordinates: 52.9225°N 1.4758°W

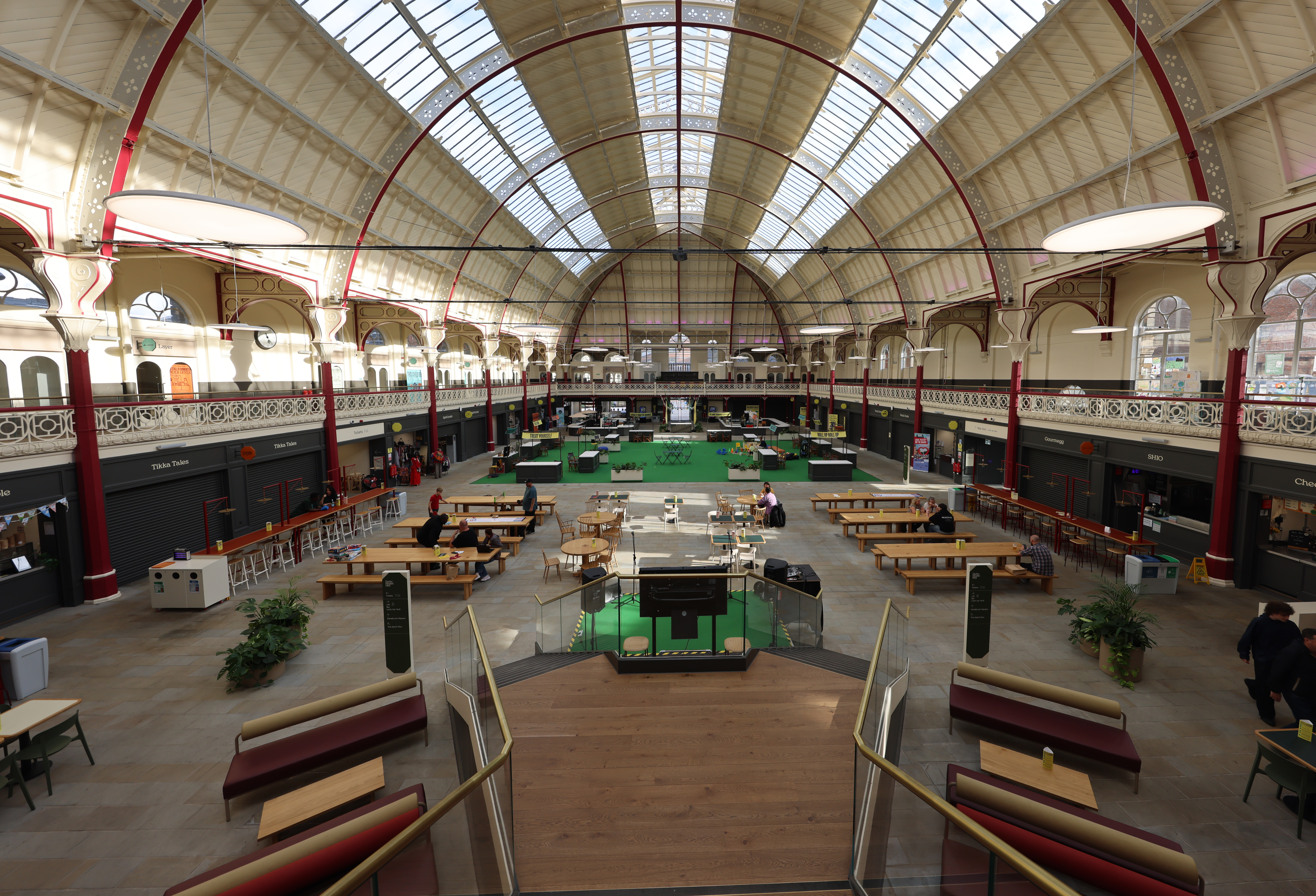
Interior of Derby market hall

Derby Market Hall is an indoor market located in the English city of Derby, United Kingdom. The market was built between 1864 and 1866 at a cost of £29,000. The initial design was by Thomas C Thorburn the then Borough engineer. The details were contracted out to James Stevens with further modifications made in response to safety issues by Thorburn's successor George Thompson. The building's roof is an iron and glass barrel vault reaching a height of 64 feet.

Starting in 1937 the building underwent a refurbishment costing £12,200. It finished in September 1938 with the market gaining a heating system for the first time. Another refurbishment started in 1988, this time costing £3.5 million and finishing in spring 1989.

The market was awarded grade II listed status in 1977.

In the 2020s, it underwent a three-year refit at a cost of £35 million, reopening in May 2025. This was an increase from the initially budgeted £11.18 million. During the work a steeplejack was killed when he fell from the roof.
